Annavaram is a temple town on the banks of the Pampa River. It is located in Kakinada district of the Indian state of Andhra Pradesh. The village has the temple of Veera Venkata Satyanarayana, a form of Vishnu on the Ratnagiri Hill.

Etymology 

Anna translates to food in Telugu, the local language and the place was known for distribution of food, which might have given the settlement its name as Annavaram. Another derivative was from Anina varam, possessing boon from the lord, would have also given the name.

Transport 
National Highway 16 passes through the village. The APSRTC operates bus services from Annavaram bus station. Annavaram railway station is located on the Howrah-Chennai main line. It is classified as a B–category station in the Vijayawada railway division of South Central Railway zone.

References

External links 

Villages in Gandepalle mandal